The Great American Weed Smoker is the fourth studio album by American Detroit-based horrorcore rapper King Gordy. It was released on August 1, 2008 via Morbid Music LLC. The record featured guest appearances from The Fat Killahz and Bizarre of D12.

Track listing
All tracks composed by Waverly Walter Alford.

References

External links

2008 albums
King Gordy albums